The House on Pine Street is a 2015 independent psychological drama-horror film written by Aaron Keeling, Austin Keeling, and Natalie Jones, and directed by Aaron Keeling and Austin Keeling. The project was partially funded through a Kickstarter campaign.  Principal photography took place over 19 days in the spring of 2014.

Plot

Cast
 Emily Goss as Jennifer
 Taylor Bottles as Luke
 Cathy Barnett as Meredith
 Jim Korinke as Walter
 Natalie Pellegrini as Lauren
 Keagon Ellison as Brad
 Tisha Swart-Entwistle as Marlene

Production credits
Directors: Aaron Keeling and Austin Keeling
Producers: Natalie Jones, Aaron Keeling, and Austin Keeling
Screenwriters: Natalie Jones, Aaron Keeling, and Austin Keeling
Music: Nathan Matthew David and Jeremy Lamb
Director of Photography: Juan Sebastian Baron
Film Editor: Austin Keeling
Production Designer: Monique Thomas
Sound: C.J. Drumeller
Colorist: Taylre Jones
Hair and Makeup: Colleen Quinn Nosbish
Stunt Coordinator:  Mark Bedell
Practical Effects Coordinator:Mark Bedell

Release 
The World Premiere was on February 28, 2015 and was part of the Cinequest Film Festival in San Jose, California that featured over 200 films including 91 World, North American and U.S. Premieres from over 50 countries.

Reception 

The San Jose Mercury News named The House on Pine Street as one of the "Cinequest 2015: 6 Films You Need to See".

Accolades and awards
 Official Selection and World Premiere, Cinequest Film Festival - Silicon Valley.
 Cinequest 2015: 6 Films You Need to See.
 Audience Favorite for Encore Day Performance, 2015, Cinequest Film Festival, San Jose, California
 Winner, Best Actress, 2015, Emily Gross in The House on Pine Street, Fargo Film Festival, Fargo, North Dakota
 Honorable Mention, Best Narrative Feature, 2015, Fargo Film Festival, Fargo, North Dakota,
 Official Selection, 2015 Sonoma International Film Festival, Sonoma, California
 Official Selection, International Horror and Sci-Fi Film Festival, Phoenix, Arizona
 Encore Screening Selection, International Horror and Sci-Fi Film Festival, Phoenix, Arizona
 Opening Night Feature, FANT Film Festival 2015, Bilbao, Spain
 Non-competing Selection, Nocturna Madrid International Fantastic Film Festival 2015, Madrid, Spain,
 Official Selection, Blue Whiskey Independent Film Festival 2015, Palatine, IL
 Winner, Best Actress: Emily Goss, Blue Whiskey Independent Film Festival 2015, Palatine, IL
 Winner, Best Sound: C.J. Drumeller, Blue Whiskey Independent Film Festival 2015, Palatine, IL
 Winner, Best Effects: Brian Magarian and Matt O'Neill, Blue Whiskey Independent Film Festival 2015, Palatine, IL
 Winner, Promising Filmmakers: Aaron Keeling and Austin Keeling, Blue Whiskey Independent Film Festival 2015, Palatine, IL
 Official Selection, Lost Episode Festival Toronto 2015, Toronto, Canada
 Official Premier Selection, Macabro Festival Internacional de Cine de Horror 2015,  Mexico City, Mexico
 Official Selection, NOLA Horror Film Festival 2015, New Orleans, LA
 Winner, Best Director: Aaron Keeling and Austin Keeling, NOLA Horror Film Festival 2015, New Orleans, LA<
 Winner, Best Feature Film, NOLA Horror Film Festival 2015, New Orleans, LA
 Nominated, Best Actress: Emily Goss, NOLA Horror Film Festival 2015, New Orleans, LA
 Nominated, Best Screenplay: Natalie Jones, Aaron Keeling, and Austin Keeling, NOLA Horror Film Festival 2015, New Orleans, LA
 Official Selection, Calgary International Film Festival 2015, Calgary, Canada
 Official Selection, South Dakota Film Festival 2015, Aberdeen, SD
 Best Narrative Feature Film, South Dakota Film Festival 2015, Aberdeen, SD
 Jury Award for Best Actress: Emily Goss, South Dakota Film Festival 2015, Aberdeen, SD
 Official Selection, Kansas International Film Festival 2015, Overland Park, KS
 Jury Award Winner, Best Narrative, Kansas International Film Festival 2015, Overland Park, KS
 Audience Award Winner, Best Narrative Feature Film, Kansas International Film Festival 2015, Overland Park, KS
 Official Selection, Festival de Cine de Terror de Molins de Rei 2015, Barcelona, Spain

References

External links 
 
 
 Official Facebook Page
 Review by Variety
 Review by Rhino's Horror
 Dread Central Page
 JMH Digital Review
 Horror-Movies.ca page
 Fargo Monthly, Fargo Film Festival page
 USC School of Cinematic Arts News, Alumni Build House on Pine Street, February 24, 2015

2015 films
2015 horror films
American psychological horror films
2010s psychological horror films
Films shot in Kansas
2010s English-language films
2010s American films